Corrosion is the third full-length studio album by Vancouver industrial band Front Line Assembly, released in 1988.

Track listing

Personnel

Front Line Assembly
 Bill Leeb – production, vocals
 Michael Balch – production

Additional musicians
 Paul Garrison – guitar (2)

Technical personnel
 Dave Ogilvie – mixing (1, 2, 6, 8)
 Maurice Conchis – cover design

References

Front Line Assembly albums
1988 EPs
Wax Trax! Records albums
Third Mind Records albums